Michael Alan Bynum (born March 20, 1978) is a former starting pitcher in Major League Baseball who played for the San Diego Padres from  to .

He was drafted by the Boston Red Sox out of high school, but opted to attend the University of North Carolina. In 1997 and 1998, he played collegiate summer baseball with the Hyannis Mets of the Cape Cod Baseball League and was named a league all-star in 1998. He was selected by the Padres in the first round of the 1999 MLB Draft. He was released by the Padres on December 15, 2004.

References

External links

1978 births
Living people
Major League Baseball pitchers
San Diego Padres players
Baseball players from Tampa, Florida
Hyannis Harbor Hawks players
Portland Beavers players
Erie SeaWolves players
Toledo Mud Hens players